Clomocycline is a tetracycline antibiotic. It is used to treat Pustulosis palmaris et plantaris.

References 

Chloroarenes
Tetracycline antibiotics
Triketones